Ashby, Norfolk may be a reference to a couple of places in the English county of Norfolk:

 the hamlet of Ashby, part of the parish of Ashby with Oby
 the village of Ashby St Mary